Ant farm may refer to:

Science
 A formicarium, designed primarily for the study of ant colonies
 Agriculture by fungus-growing ants

Arts and media
 Ant Farm (group), a group of artists that reached prominence in the 1970s
 A.N.T. Farm, a Disney Channel television series (2011–2014) starring China Anne McClain
 The Ant Farm, an advertising agency in Los Angeles
 Ant Farm (album), a 1994 album by 8 Bold Souls